Elliot Anderson may refer to:

 Elliot Anderson (politician) (born 1982), American politician
 Elliot Anderson (footballer) (born 2002), Scottish footballer